Scheiblingkirchen-Thernberg is a town in the district of Neunkirchen in the Austrian state of Lower Austria.

Geography 
Scheiblingkirchen-Thernberg is located in the Industrieviertel of Lower Austria.

Population and Demographics

According to the 2001 Census, 92.7% of the population is Roman-Catholic, 1% is Evangelical, 0.3% is Muslim, 0.1% is Orthodox, and 4.8% does not belong to a religious denomination.

References

Cities and towns in Neunkirchen District, Austria
Bucklige Welt